HM Prison Oxford was a prison located in Oxford Castle from 1888 until 1996. The castle had been used as a prison since the seventeenth century, but it only acquired the name HM Prison Oxford in the 1888 prison reforms.

In August 1972, prisoners staged a roof-top protest as part of the prison strike organised by Preservation of the Rights of Prisoners.

References

Defunct prisons in England